Alfred, Hereditary Prince of Saxe-Coburg and Gotha, KG, (Alfred Alexander William Ernest Albert; 15 October 1874 – 6 February 1899), was the son and heir apparent of Alfred, Duke of Saxe-Coburg and Gotha. He died aged 24 under circumstances still not entirely clear. He was a first cousin of Kaiser Wilhelm II of Germany, King George V of the United Kingdom and Tsar Nicholas II of Russia.

Early life
Prince Alfred of Edinburgh was born on 15 October 1874  at Buckingham Palace, London. His father was Prince Alfred, Duke of Edinburgh, second eldest son of Queen Victoria and Prince Albert. His mother, Grand Duchess Maria Alexandrovna of Russia, was a daughter of Emperor Alexander II of Russia and Princess Marie of Hesse and by Rhine.

Archibald Campbell Tait, Archbishop of Canterbury, baptised the prince in the Lower Bow Room of Buckingham Palace on 23 November 1874. His godparents were the Queen, the Emperor of Russia (whose son Tsesarevich Alexander stood proxy for him), the German Emperor (for whom Alfred's paternal uncle Prince Arthur, Duke of Connaught and Strathearn stood proxy), the German Crown Princess (Alfred's paternal aunt, for whom her sister Princess Christian of Schleswig-Holstein stood proxy), the Duke of Saxe-Coburg and Gotha (his paternal grand-uncle, for whom Prince Christian of Schleswig-Holstein stood proxy), and the Prince of Wales (his paternal uncle).

Hereditary Prince of Saxe-Coburg and Gotha
In 1893, his granduncle, Ernest II, Duke of Saxe-Coburg and Gotha, the elder brother of his paternal grandfather, died without legitimate heirs. Being ineligible under Saxe-Coburg-Gotha house law to succeed to the duchy due to his status as the heir apparent to an existing throne,  the Prince of Wales had previously renounced his claim to the ducal throne. Thus, the succession devolved to Alfred's father, who was at that time the Duke of Edinburgh. Alfred thus became the Hereditary Prince of Saxe-Coburg and Gotha.

Prince Alfred had lived in Clarence House in the early years of his life with his parents and sisters; after his father's accession to the ducal throne of Saxe-Coburg and Gotha, he moved to Schloss Rosenau, near Coburg.

Death

On 23 January 1899 Maria Alexandrovna and her husband celebrated their 25th wedding anniversary at Schloss Friedestein, the Duke's official residence in Gotha. Absent from the festivities was their only son, who was gravely ill.

The exact circumstances of Alfred's death are not known, and varying accounts have been published.  His sister Marie's memoirs simply say his health "broke down", and other writers have said that he had "consumption". The Times published an account stating he had died of a tumor, while the Complete Peerage gives the generally accepted account that he "shot himself".

Various authors have speculated on reasons why he might have killed himself. One author, Frank Bush, claimed to have been a descendant of a secret marriage between Alfred and Mabel Fitzgerald, granddaughter of the 4th Duke of Leinster, and claimed that friction between Alfred and his family over the "secret marriage" was the cause of the suicide. Despite the lack of documentary evidence, and the lack of contemporary reference, other authors have repeated Bush's assertion that Alfred and Mabel married, including John van der Kiste and Bee Jordaan in Dearest Affie, and the assertion is repeated as fact in the official family history (Das Haus von Sachsen-Coburg und Gotha).

According to rumors, Alfred shot himself with a revolver while the rest of the family was gathered for the anniversary celebration. He survived and was looked after at Schloss Friedenstein in Gotha (Thuringia) for three days before being sent to the Martinsbrunn Sanatorium in Gratsch near Meran in the County of Tyrol (Austria-Hungary, now Italy). Alfred died there at 4:15 pm on 6 February 1899, aged 24 years. He was buried in the ducal mausoleum of the Friedhof am Glockenberg, Coburg, Bavaria (southern Germany).

After his death, Alfred's uncle the Duke of Connaught and his son Prince Arthur of Connaught renounced their succession rights to the Duchy of Saxe-Coburg and Gotha in July 1899.  As a result, his first cousin Prince Charles Edward, Duke of Albany, became heir presumptive.

Titles, styles, honours and arms

Titles and styles
15 October 1874 – 23 August 1893: His Royal Highness Prince Alfred of Edinburgh
23 August 1893 – 6 February 1899: His Royal Highness The Hereditary Prince of Saxe-Coburg and Gotha

Honours
He received the following orders and decorations:

Arms
As a male-line grandson of the British Sovereign, young Alfred bore the royal arms, with an inescutcheon of the shield of Saxony, all differenced by a label argent of five points, the odd bearing crosses gules and even anchors azure.

Ancestors

Notes

References

External links

English people of Russian descent
Princes of the United Kingdom
House of Saxe-Coburg and Gotha (United Kingdom)
Knights of the Garter
Knights of Justice of the Order of St John
Suicides by firearm in Austria
Heirs apparent who never acceded
1874 births
1899 deaths
Burials at the Ducal Family Mausoleum, Glockenburg Cemetery, Coburg
Princes of Saxe-Coburg and Gotha
People from Westminster
1890s suicides
Sons of monarchs